Phra Nakhon Si Ayutthaya Hospital is the main hospital of Phra Nakhon Si Ayutthaya Province, Thailand and is classified under the Ministry of Public Health as a regional hospital. It is an affiliated hospital of the Faculty of Medicine Ramathibodi Hospital, Mahidol University and Phramongkutklao College of Medicine.

History 
After the death of King Chulalongkorn in 1910, the local authorities and citizens funded for a hospital in memory of King Chulalongkorn and this was known as "Panchamathirachuthit Hospital". In 1939, the Ministry of Public Health planned for the construction of a new hospital and construction started the following year, initially with one OPD building. Most patients came by water transport, and thus in 1942, a canal was dug from the Chao Phraya River surrounding Ayutthaya's old town to the hospital.

In 1990, the hospital had a major renovation led by then Minister of Public Health, Boonpan Kaewattana under Chuan Leekpai's cabinet. The hospital was flooded in October 1995 which significantly damaged hospital property. Aid such as water pumps were provided by King Bhumibol Adulyadej and King Vajiralongkorn (then crown prince) to reduce the effects of the flood.

See also 
 Healthcare in Thailand
 Hospitals in Thailand
 List of hospitals in Thailand

References 

Hospitals in Thailand
Phra Nakhon Si Ayutthaya province